Vozrozhdeniye is a rural locality (a settlement) in Pervomayskoye Rural Settlement, Ertilsky District, Voronezh Oblast, Russia. The population was 79 in 2010. There are three streets.

Geography 
Pervomaysky is the nearest rural locality.

References 

Rural localities in Ertilsky District